Goose Island is a small, rocky island in Long Island Sound and a part of the city of New Rochelle in Westchester County, New York. The island is situated between Davids, Travers, and Glen islands in New Rochelle's Lower Harbor area, just west of New Rochelle's border with New York City. It is surrounded by a stone wall which shows above the water.

See also
New York islands

References

External links

 Satellite Map of Goose Island
 NYHomeTownLocator - Goose Island

Long Island Sound
Geography of New Rochelle, New York
Islands of New York (state)
Private islands of New York (state)